The Gaisspitze (also called Geißspitze) is a cone shaped mountain in the Verwall Alps in the Austrian state of Tyrol and north of the municipality Galtür.

The nearest taller mountain is the Glatter Berg (2866 m), about 1 km north. They are separated via the col Muttenjoch (2620 m).

There are two alpine club huts nearby:
 Heilbronner Hütte (2,329 m)
 Friedrichshafener Hütte

Normal routes to the summits are from both huts via Muttenjoch.

References

Literature 
 Peter Pindur, Roland Luzian, Andreas Weiskopf: Verwallgruppe. Alpenvereinsführer, 10th edition, Bergverlag Rother, Munich 2005, pages 155–155–156,

External links 
 Picture of Gaisspitze

Mountains of Tyrol (state)
Mountains of the Alps
Verwall Alps
Two-thousanders of Austria